Gao Xinyu (born 21 November 1997) is a Chinese tennis player.

Gao has a career-high singles ranking of world No. 181, achieved on 31 July 2017. On 11 September 2017, she peaked at No. 230 in the doubles ranking. Gao has won nine singles and four doubles title on the ITF Circuit.

In 2016, she made her WTA Tour main-draw debut at the Tianjin Open, where she was given a wildcard with Zhang Ying. The pair won their first round, defeating Han Xinyun and Zhang Kailin. They fell in the quarterfinals to second seeds Lara Arruabarrena and Oksana Kalashnikova.

ITF Circuit finals

Singles: 11 (10 titles, 1 runner-up)

Doubles: 8 (4 titles, 4 runner-ups)

External links
 
 

1997 births
Living people
Chinese female tennis players
Tennis players from Beijing
21st-century Chinese women